Andrea Ruiz is an Argentine politician who served as a provincial deputy in Santiago del Estero Province in Argentina, elected in October 2013.

She is a member of the Workers' Party, and was elected as a candidate of the Workers' Left Front. Ruiz shared responsibilities for overseeing banking in the provincial legislature with Anisa Favoretti.

Ruiz organized a local event of "Ni una menos" in Santiago del Estero to raise awareness about gender-based violence in 2016.

References

External links 
Report on Ruiz's election 

21st-century Argentine women politicians
21st-century Argentine politicians
Workers' Party (Argentina) politicians
People from Santiago del Estero Province
Members of the Chamber of Deputies of Santiago del Estero
Argentine schoolteachers
Argentine women educators
Living people
Year of birth missing (living people)